Konstantin Fyodorovich Bogaevsky (transcribed Konstantin Fyodorovich Bogayevsky, Feodosia, Crimea, Russian Empire,  - Feodosia, Crimea, Russian SFSR, USSR, 17 February 1943) was a Ukrainian and Russian painter from Crimea notable for his Symbolist landscapes.

Biography
He took first lessons in art from Ivan Aivazovsky.

In 1891-1897 he studied at the Imperial Academy of Arts in the class of Arkhip Kuindzhi. The art of young Konstantin was not popular with the Academy and he was even at some stage temporarily discharged from the Academy for "lack of talent". Despite this, Kuindzhi always had a high respect for his pupil and protected him. In 1898 Konstantin traveled to Italy and France where he became acquainted with the works of Claude Lorrain, whom he proclaimed as his true teacher. His first exhibition was in Moscow in 1898.

From 1900 Bogaevsky worked in Feodosia. The main theme of his works became the symbolist landscapes of a non-existent land (known to his friends as Bogaevia) that he saw only in his dreams. Konstantin Bogaevsky became a popular painter after Maximilian Voloshin published a series of essays titled Konstantin Bogaevsky. Voloshin highly praised the symbolism of Bogaevsky's paintings. Contemporaries often drew parallels between Bogaevsky and Nicholas Roerich.

Bogaevsky was a member of Mir iskusstva, Union of Russian Artists, and the Zhar-Tsvet. In 1906 he exhibited his paintings on Exposition de l'Art Russe organized by Sergei Diaghilev. In 1911 he visited Italy and discovered for himself the paintings of Andrea Mantegna, which were to strongly influence Bogaevsky's own later work.

Bogaevsky returned in 1912 to Feodosia where he was to remain for the rest of his life. He maintained a friendship of many years with another famous Feodosian and a bard of a non-existent land, Alexander Grin, as well as with the Koktebel group of Russian Intelligentsia including Maximilian Voloshin, Marina Tsvetaeva, and Osip Mandelstam.

After the October Revolution Bogaevsky retreated into relative obscurity, although works such as the 1932 Port of an Imaginary City were highly regarded as art in the school of Socialist Realism painting of the DnieproGES.

He died at Feodosia on 17 February 1943. A minor planet, 3839 Bogaevskij, discovered by Soviet astronomer Nikolai Stepanovich Chernykh in 1971, is named after him.

Style and Works 
In 1902-1903 Konstantin Bogaevsky created a series of paintings based on the familiar Crimean landscapes ("The Old Crimea", "The Ancient Fortress"). For a long time after that, he painted landscapes, not tied to particular places, in which the influence of Böcklin and Klimt is noticeable. They are characterised by special lighting, originating from several stains of colour, and expressive skies. Besides Klimt, parallels in Western European painting can be found in Giovanni Segantini.  Influenced by Maximilian Voloshin, Bogayevsky paints the so-called "Cimmerian cycle" of paintings. "In my compositions, I try to convey the image of this Earth - majestic and beautiful, solemn and sad. This landscape, saturated with a great historical past, with a peculiar rhythm of mountains, tense folds of hills, bearing a somewhat austere character, serves as an inexhaustible source for me..." - wrote Bogaevsky.

From 1906, after long isolation in military service in Kerch, philosophical motifs associated with loneliness and the smallness of man appear in Bogayevsky's work.

After a trip to Europe, starting in 1910, Bogayevsky painted classical landscapes, clearly inspired by German (Dürer, Altdorfer) and Italian (Mantegna) Renaissance masters, as well as by the undoubted influence of Claude Lorrain, from whom Bogayevsky borrowed the idea of lighting. In 1912, Bogaevsky painted three panels for the Moscow residence of Stepan Ryabushinsky.

Tretyakov Gallery, Russian Museum, Feodosia Art Gallery, Sevastopol Art Museum, Simferopol Art Museum, and Sochi Art Museum are the most widely represented museums.

Selected paintings

References

External links

Kostiantyn Bogaevsky. Album. Kyiv, Mistectvo, 1973. 81 pages.
Online Bogaevsky Gallery
Maximilan Voloshin ''Konstantin Bogaevsky
Biography of Bogaevsky
Biography of Bogaevsky
Bogaevsky's art
Biography
A collection of Bogaevsky's pictures
  Bogaevsky  -  Voloshin.  Poetry And Painting.

1872 births
1943 deaths
19th-century Ukrainian painters
19th-century Ukrainian male artists
19th-century male artists from the Russian Empire
20th-century Ukrainian painters
20th-century Ukrainian male artists
Ukrainian painters
19th-century painters from the Russian Empire
Russian male painters
20th-century Russian painters
Soviet painters
People from Feodosia
20th-century Russian male artists